Sir Nevill Francis Mott  (30 September 1905 – 8 August 1996) was a British physicist who won the Nobel Prize for Physics in 1977 for his work on the electronic structure of magnetic and disordered systems, especially amorphous semiconductors. The award was shared with Philip W. Anderson and J. H. Van Vleck. The three had conducted loosely related research. Mott and Anderson clarified the reasons why magnetic or amorphous materials can sometimes be metallic and sometimes insulating.

Education and early life 
Mott was born in Leeds to Lilian Mary Reynolds and Charles Francis Mott and grew up first in the village of Giggleswick, in the West Riding of Yorkshire, where his father was Senior Science Master at Giggleswick School.  His mother also taught Maths at the School.  The family moved (due to his father's jobs) first to Staffordshire, then to Chester and finally Liverpool, where his father had been appointed Director of Education. Mott was at first educated at home by his mother, who was a Cambridge Mathematics Tripos graduate. His parents had met in the Cavendish Laboratory, when both were engaged in physics research. At age ten, he began formal education at Clifton College in Bristol, followed by study at St John's College, Cambridge, where he read the Mathematics Tripos.

Career and research 
Mott was appointed a Lecturer in the Physics Department at the University of Manchester in 1929. He returned to Cambridge in 1930 as a Fellow and lecturer of Gonville and Caius College, and in 1933 moved to the University of Bristol as Melville Wills Professor in Theoretical Physics.

In 1948 he became Henry Overton Wills Professor of Physics and Director of the Henry Herbert Wills Physical Laboratory at Bristol. In 1954 he was appointed Cavendish Professor of Physics at Cambridge, a post he held until 1971. He was instrumental in the painful cancellation of the planned particle accelerator because of its very high cost. He also served as Master of Gonville and Caius College, 1959–1966.

His early works were on the theoretical analysis of collisions in gases, notably the collision with spin flip of an electron against a hydrogen atom, which would stimulate subsequent works by André Blandin and Jun Kondo about similar effects between conduction electrons, as well as magnetic properties in metals. This sort of activity led Mott to writing two books. The first one, which was edited together with Ian Sneddon, gives a simple and clear description of quantum mechanics, with an emphasis on the Schrödinger equation in real space. The second describes atomic and electronic collisions in gases, using the rotational symmetry of electronic states in the Hartree–Fock method.

But already in the middle of the 1930s, Mott's interests had broadened to include solid states, leading to two more books that would have a great impact on the development of the field in the years prior and after World War II. In 1936, Theory of the Properties of  Metals and Alloys (written together with H. Jones) describes a simplified framework which led to rapid progress.

The concept of nearly free valence electrons in metallic alloys explained the special stability of the Hume-Rothery phases if the Fermi sphere of the sp Valence electron, treated as free, would be scattered by the Brillouin zone boundaries of the atomic structure. The description of the impurities in metals by the Thomas Fermi approximation would explain why such impurities would not interact at long range. Finally the delocalisation of the valence d electrons in transitional metals and alloys would explain the possibility for the magnetic moments of atoms to be expressed as fractions of Bohr magnetons, leading to ferro or antiferromagnetic coupling at short range. This last contribution, produced at the first international conference on magnetism, held in Strasbourg in May 1939, reinforced similar points of view defended at the time in France by the future Nobel laureate Louis Néel. In 1949, Mott suggested to Jacques Friedel to use the approach developed together with Marvey for a more accurate description of the electric-field screening of the impurity in a metal, leading to the characteristic long range charge oscillations. Friedel also used the concept developed in that book of virtual bound level to describe a situation when the atomic potential considered is not quite strong enough to create a (real) bound level of symmetry e ≠ o. The consequences of these remarks on the more exact approaches of cohesion in rp as well as d metals were mostly developed by his students in Orsay.

The second book, with Ronald Wilfred Gurney, On the Physical Chemistry of Solids was more wide-ranging. It treated notably of the oxidation of metals at low temperatures, where it described the growth of the oxide layer as due to the electric field developed between the metal and absorbed oxygen ions, which could force the way of metallic or oxygen ions through a disordered oxide layer. The book also analysed the photographic reactions in ionic silver compound in terms of precipitation of silver ions into metallic clusters.

This second field had a direct and long lasting consequence on the research activity of John (Jack) Mitchell. Mott's accomplishments include explaining theoretically the effect of light on a photographic emulsion (see latent image). His work on oxidation, besides fostering new research in the field (notably by J. Bénard and Nicolás Cabrera), was the root of the concept of the band gap produced in semiconductors by gradients in the distribution of donor and acceptor impurities.

During the war Mott worked on the role of plastic deformation in the progression of fracture cracks. When he returned to Bristol after the war, his having met and hired Frederick Charles Frank enabled the two of them to make considerable advances in the study of dislocations, with the help of others such as Frank Nabarro and Alan Cottrell. Bristol became an important centre of research in this topic, especially at the end of the 1940s. If Mott only produced early and somewhat minor contributions to that field, notably on alloy hardening with Nabarro and on the topology of a dislocation network lowering the apparent elastic constants of a crystal, there is no doubt that Mott's enthusiasm played its role in the three major steps forward in the field by F. C. Frank on crystal growth and plasticity and later, in Cambridge, by P. Hirsch on thin film electron microscopy.

At the same time, however, Mott gave a lot of thought to electronic correlations and their possible role in Verwey's compounds such as nickel oxides which could switch from metals to nonmetallic insulators under various physical conditions - this is known as the Mott transition. The term Mott insulator is also named for him, as well as the Mott polynomials, which he introduced.

Publications 
N. F. Mott revived the old Philosophical Magazine and transformed it into a lively publication essentially centred on the then-new field of solid state physics, attracting writers, readers and general interest on a wide scale. After receiving a paper on point defects in crystals by Frederick Seitz that was obviously too long for the journal, Mott decided to create a new publication, Advances in Physics, for such review papers. Both publications are still active in 2017.

 N. F. Mott, "The Wave Mechanics of α-Ray Tracks", Proceedings of the Royal Society (1929) A126, pp. 79–84, . (reprinted as Sec. I-6 of Quantum Theory and Measurement, J. A. Wheeler. and W. H. Zurek, (1983) Princeton).
 N. F. Mott, Metal-Insulator Transitions, second edition (Taylor & Francis, London, 1990). , 
 N. F. Mott, A Life in Science (Taylor & Francis, London, 1986). , 
 N. F. Mott, H. Jones, The Theory of Properties of Metals and Alloys, (Dover Publications Inc., New York, 1958)
 Brian Pippard, Nevill Francis Mott, Physics Today, March 1997, pp. 95 and 96: (pdf).

Awards and honours 
In 1977, Nevill Mott was awarded the Nobel Prize in Physics, together with Philip Warren Anderson and John Hasbrouck Van Vleck "for their fundamental theoretical investigations of the electronic structure of magnetic and disordered systems." The news of having won the Nobel Prize received Mott while having lunch at restaurant Die Sonne in Marburg, Germany, during a visit to fellow solid state scientist at Marburg University.

Mott was elected a Fellow of the Royal Society (FRS) in 1936.  Mott served as president of the Physical Society in 1957. In the early 1960s he was chairman of the British Pugwash group. He was knighted in 1962.

Mott received an honorary Doctorate from Heriot-Watt University in 1972.

In 1981, Mott became a founding member of the World Cultural Council.

He continued to work until he was about ninety. He was made a Companion of Honour in 1995.

In 1995, Mott visited the Loughborough University Department of Physics and presented a lecture entitled "65 Years in Physics". The University continues to host the annual Sir Nevill Mott Lecture.

Personal life 
Mott was married to Ruth Eleanor Horder, and had two daughters, Elizabeth and Alice. He died in Milton Keynes on 8 August 1996 at the age 90, Buckinghamshire. His autobiography, A Life in Science, was published in 1986 by Taylor & Francis.

References

External links

 
  including the Nobel Lecture, 8 December 1977 Electrons in Glass

1905 births
1996 deaths
Alumni of St John's College, Cambridge
Academics of the University of Bristol
English physicists
British Nobel laureates
Fellows of Gonville and Caius College, Cambridge
Masters of Gonville and Caius College, Cambridge
Fellows of the Royal Society
Foreign associates of the National Academy of Sciences
Members of the Order of the Companions of Honour
Nobel laureates in Physics
People educated at Clifton College
People educated at Giggleswick School
Royal Medal winners
Recipients of the Copley Medal
Knights Bachelor
Presidents of the Physical Society
English Nobel laureates
Founding members of the World Cultural Council
20th-century British physicists
Scientists from Yorkshire
Cavendish Professors of Physics
Presidents of the International Union of Pure and Applied Physics